Grenadian Creole may refer to:

 Grenadian Creole English, an Eastern Atlantic Creole
 Grenadian Creole French or Patois, a variety of Antillean Creole French

Language and nationality disambiguation pages